The Viaur is a  river in south-western France. It is a left tributary of the Aveyron. Its source is in the southern Massif Central, north of Millau. It flows generally west through the following departments and towns:

 Aveyron: Pont-de-Salars
 Tarn: Pampelonne
 Tarn-et-Garonne: Laguépie

The Viaur flows into the Aveyron in Laguépie.

Its main tributary is the Céor.

References

Rivers of France
Rivers of Occitania (administrative region)
Rivers of Aveyron
Rivers of Tarn (department)
Rivers of Tarn-et-Garonne